Encyclopedia of Shi'a is an encyclopedia on Shia studies that was published in 14 volumes between 1981 and 2011. The editor-in-chief is Ahmad Seyed Javadi. The writing of this encyclopedia started in 1981 with the sponsorship of The Taher Foundation and was followed by the sponsorship of Fahime Mohebbi.

References 

Encyclopedias of Islam
Persian encyclopedias
Iranian books
Shia Islam
1981 non-fiction books
20th-century encyclopedias
21st-century encyclopedias